WikiTree is a free, shared social-networking genealogy website that allows users individually to research and to contribute to their own personal family trees while building and collaborating on a singular worldwide family tree within the same system.  Chris Whitten, developer of the WikiAnswers website, set up WikiTree in 2008; the site is owned and hosted by Interesting.com, Inc.

The site uses a wiki markup language (powered by MediaWiki software) that offers users the ability to create and edit personal profiles, categories and "free space" pages to document their family's history. , the WikiTree website has more than 980,000 registered members and included more than 33 million profiles, with 11 million having DNA test connections. GenealogyInTime Magazine listed WikiTree as the 15th most popular genealogy site (out of 100)  (the most recent time the magazine produced such a list).

Honor Code
Users requesting membership in the WikiTree community are asked to commit to a nine-point Honor Code that encourages collaboration, accuracy, and the use of sources and citations. Courtesy in dealing with other members, consideration of copyrights, and respect for the privacy of others are also among the values set forth in the Honor Code.

User privacy 
WikiTree's privacy controls allow users to protect their personal information, and that of their more recent ancestors and descendants, while providing the ability to publicly share and collaborate on historical data related to their more distant forebears.  Each profile is managed by one or more profile managers, and other members who may be related or willing to share information about that person can be added to the profile's "Trusted List".  Members of a profile's Trusted List have full access to view and edit details on the page, regardless of the privacy level, and all changes are tracked for future reference.  WikiTree maintains seven different profile privacy levels

A distinctive aspect of the collaborative nature of WikiTree is that profiles of people who were either born more than 150 years ago or who have been deceased for more than 100 years are open for editing by any member who is a Wiki Genealogist (meaning they have agreed to and signed the Honor Code).  As with all contributions to WikiTree, members are requested to provide source citations to justify their changes. Because of the collaborative nature of WikiTree, members who have documented the genealogy of their family are expected to work on open profiles in conjunction with other members to ensure the information provided is as accurate as possible. When it comes to disputes over what information is correct, any sources that are provided are used to find the definitive answer. The community developed a conflict escalation process to help with the resolution of such disputes.

Recognizing that in some cases this openness can lead to unwanted and unwarranted additions to the global family tree, the volunteer leaders at WikiTree have created procedures for working with two special categories of ancestor profiles. Members must pass a self-evaluated quiz to edit profiles of persons whose birth year is from 1500 to 1699, which includes most of the early colonial period in the Americas. Members can “pass” this test by demonstrating they have read the WikiTree source and editing guidelines. As of January 2016, a more stringent evaluation, based on a member's demonstrated genealogical experience and ability to work cooperatively, is now required to edit profiles of persons born before 1500. This process attempts to strike a balance between open and collaborative editing and the desire to strive for historical accuracy and credibility within the genealogical community.

Features
The WikiTree site emphasizes the building of a shared, worldwide family tree. Members do not maintain individual trees, but instead contribute to a single collaborative tree. The site's goal is to have one profile for every person, whether living or dead. Duplicate profiles are merged and the information is consolidated, connecting different family branches in the process.

The site maintains a page of “frequently asked questions” (FAQs) and a “genealogist to genealogist” (G2G) forum that allows users to get answers and help with both genealogical and technical questions.  Points and badges are awarded to members who answer questions and contribute information to the site.  Additionally, the site is managed by a team of volunteer leaders and mentors that serves the community in a variety of capacities, in particular with helping users gain proficiency in using the system.

Projects
Leaders also manage numerous projects within the site that further organize researchers by specific interests.  Among the current projects are the 1776, Acadians, Australian Convicts and First Settlers, US Black Heritage, European Aristocrats, Puritan Great Migration, Scottish Clans, U.S. Civil War, and U.S. Presidents projects.  Many of the projects maintain Google and Facebook groups to keep members informed of current happenings and topics for discussion.
 
Some examples of projects on the site are the Cemeterist Project and the Global Family Reunion Project, a tie-in to a worldwide family genealogy event that was hosted by author A.J. Jacobs. The Global Family Reunion took place at the New York Hall of Science, located in Flushing Meadows-Corona Park, Queens, on June 6, 2015. The site also maintains a blog that presents two other frequently visited pages: the “Profile of the Week” and the “Photo of the Week”.  Active members are asked to view and vote on the best submissions for each category.

Events
WikiTree runs a variety of events, many of which are recurring. Ongoing or recurring events include the Data Doctors Challenge, which cleans up database errors; the 52 Weeks of Photos Challenge, which encourages members to add a photo a week to a profile; and the WikiTree Challenge, in which a team of volunteer genealogists collaborate to make discoveries for a special guest star. WikiTree Challenge guests in 2022 included Wikipedia founder Jimmy Wales. Previous guests have included Henry Louis Gates Jr. of the show Finding Your Roots, CeCe Moore of the show The Genetic Detective, writer A. J. Jacobs, and other writers and lecturers from the genealogy community.

GEDCOM uploads and matching
Users can upload computer-generated GEDCOM files with digital genealogical data gathered from personal research and recollections, as well as from other non-copyrighted sources available elsewhere on the internet.  Once a user's GEDCOM file is uploaded, WikiTree's "GEDCompare" tool compares data contained in the file and identifies matches with existing profiles, allowing users to find details about their ancestors that have already been entered by others, and eliminating the creation of duplicated profiles.

DNA testing and confirmation
WikiTree supports doing DNA-based genealogy using DNA Ancestor Confirmation Aid (ACA), a tool that allows members to upload the results of their Y-chromosome (Y-DNA) and mitochondrial (mtDNA) tests for purposes of scientifically confirming paternal (male) and maternal (female) relationships within their family tree.  The ACA is designed to:
 confirm or reject paternal and maternal relationships over the past five generations (when DNA test results are available for other family members);
 list relevant DNA tests that would aid in the confirmation of such relationships for family members who have not been tested;
 show which such relationships have already been confirmed (via comments provided by other tested relatives);
 identify which relatives should take certain tests in order to confirm or reject such relationships; and,
 aid in finding relevant resources and other helpful information.

Registered users are invited to provide information about their autosomal DNA tests and to link their WikiTree profile pages to autosomal DNA data packages they have uploaded at the GEDmatch website. GEDmatch publishes links to the WikiTree family trees of individuals who use this feature.

Additional aspects of the site's DNA tools are discussed on the International Society of Genetic Genealogy's (ISOGG's) WikiTree wiki page.

References

External links 

 

American genealogy websites
Companies based in New York City
Internet properties established in 2008